Michael Ray Voight (February 28, 1954 – May 22, 2012) was an American football running back in the National Football League. He was drafted by the Cincinnati Bengals in the third round of the 1977 NFL Draft. He played college football at North Carolina.

References

1954 births
2012 deaths
American football running backs
North Carolina Tar Heels football players
Players of American football from Virginia
Houston Oilers players